The Shambala Festival is a four-day contemporary performing arts festival that takes place in Northamptonshire, England. In addition to contemporary music, the festival hosts rock, pop, folk, world music, and other arts. Leading pop and rock artists have headlined, alongside hundreds of others appearing on smaller stages and performance areas. Between 2010 and 2019 attendance at Shambala remained constant at about 15,000 people.

It features a variety of music, including rock, pop, folk and world music. There are also independent films, workshops, talks and debates, comedy, a fresh organic market, fair trade coffee, practical demonstrations, a speakers' corner, site art (a new art trail and a range of get-involved sculpture) and "music with a mission". Permaculturists from across the UK create a welcoming garden/ workshop space incorporating art, crafts and sounds.

On Saturday night, there are usually 7000 people in costumes. DJs and speakers headline a green venue.

Alternative venues
The Green Venue hosts conversations about world issues, an anti-GM opera, workshops and independent films.

Activism
Many activities address cultural awareness, the environment and rights. Children are able to add their messages to the Rights Tree, to be posted on the website for the world to see. Kids' activities include a full and diverse program of activities for all ages, such as creative workshops (e.g. shadow dancing), trampolines, circus fun, games, music, and a samba procession on Sunday.

Location
Though it has been held at Kelmarsh Hall for years, venue details are not provided to attendees until they buy a ticket. The event is kept secret unless you have a ticket, this helps stop gate-crashers.

Shambala Festival 2010
The 2010 event was held on 26–30 August and featured Fool's Gold, Rodney P, The Nextmen and The Gaslamp Killer.

References

External links
 Official website
 MySpace, Shambala Festival
 Flickr, Shambala Festival
 Twitter, Shambala Festival
 Facebook
 Youtube

Festivals in Northamptonshire